The Ross River Dam is a rock and earthfill-filled embankment dam across the Ross River, located between Kelso and Mount Stuart in the City of Townsville in northern Queensland, Australia. Built initially for flood control, Lake Ross, the impoundment created by the dam, serves as one of the major potable water supplies for the region.

The dam reached 250% capacity in February 2019 as a result of mass rainfall and flooding in the area.

Location and features
The dam was constructed by Leighton Contractors in 1971 for the purposes of flood mitigation and water storage. The dam was an attempt to address Townsville's dual water concerns--abundance and scarcity--and added to the city's long history of attempting to tame the natural environment.

When the dam gates open, water spills over into the Ross River. Visitors may view the dam from a viewing platform at Ross Park.

At the base of the dam and on the banks of the Ross River is Ross Park, part of Riverway, with facilities for picnics or barbecues, as well as public toilets at this location.

Upgrade of the dam wall
 2001 - a panel of experts in dam safety and construction undertook an investigation of the dam. Over two years, the panel conducted studies of the dam's compliance with world standards.
 2003 - The report confirmed that upgrades were required and by late 2003 because the dam moved  a year. At that rate, the dam would have burst in a 10-year period, causing the whole suburb of Kelso to be inundated.
 2004 - A combined GHD-MWH team was appointed to design the remaining work and manage the project. The contracting strategy was the first application of the 'Early Tenderer Involvement' (ETI) procurement model, developed by consultants ITN.
 2005 - John Holland Group and Macmahon are awarded the construction contract.
 2006 - Construction commenced with Constructing sand filters and supporting earthfill, extra rockwork to the dam embankment and the contraction of the gates.
 2007 - Project completed late 2007.

The upgrade was going to take until mid-2008 to complete unless rainfall delays construction, however it was completed ahead of time in late 2007. The cost was around 115 million.

The dam's storage was temporarily reduced with the lowering of the spillway to make way for the new floodgates that have now been fitted.

Water is supplied to surrounding areas by releasing water from the Burdekin Dam spillway into the Burdekin and Haughton Rivers. Weirs control the volume of water entering each river. The Haughton pumping station supplies water via a low pressure pipeline to Ross River Dam. The pipeline was built in 1988 by the Townsville Council. During the first decade the PVC sections of the pipeline repeatedly ruptured.

See also

List of dams and reservoirs in Queensland

References

External links 
 NQ Water

 Ross River Emergency Action Plan (EAP)
 BOM Latest River Heights for Ross R at Ross River Dam

Reservoirs in Queensland
Buildings and structures in Townsville
Dams completed in 1971
Dams in Queensland
1971 establishments in Australia
Townsville